Ascalenia exodroma is a moth in the family Cosmopterigidae. It was described by Edward Meyrick in 1897. It is found in Australia, where it has been recorded from Queensland.

This species feeds on spun leaflets of Acacia decurrens.

References

Moths described in 1897
Ascalenia
Moths of Australia